, also known as  was the 17th Emperor of Japan, according to the traditional order of succession. Both the Kojiki, and the Nihon Shoki (collectively known as the Kiki) recorded events that took place during Richū's alleged lifetime. This emperor is best known for an assassination attempt on his life by his brother Suminoe after the death of their father Emperor Nintoku. Although no firm dates can be assigned to his life, Richū's brief reign is conventionally considered to have been from 400 to 405.

During his reign local recorders were allegedly appointed for the first time in various provinces, a royal treasury was established, and court waitresses (Uneme) first appeared. Richū had both a wife and a concubine during his lifetime which bore him 4 children (2 boys and 2 girls). None of his children would inherit the throne though, as Richū appointed the title of crown prince to his other brother Mizuhawake. Richū allegedly died sometime in 405 at the age of 70, and his brother Mizuhawake was crowned as Emperor Hanzei in the following year. While the location of Richū's grave is unknown, he is traditionally venerated at a memorial Shinto tomb. Modern historians have come to the conclusion that the title of "Emperor" and the name "Richū" were used by later generations to describe him. There is also a general consensus that Richū existed rather than just being a legendary figure.

Protohistoric narrative 
The Japanese have traditionally accepted this sovereign's historical existence, and a mausoleum (misasagi) for Richū is currently maintained. These chronicles include legends and myths, as well as potential historical facts that have since been exaggerated and/or distorted over time. These records state that Richū was born to  sometime in 336 AD, and was given the name . He was the eldest son of Emperor Nintoku, and was later appointed crown prince by his father during the 31st year of his father's reign. (343 AD). When Nintoku died in 399 AD, a period of mourning was followed by a scandal that almost took the soon to be new Emperor's life.

Assassination attempt
Sometime during the interval before Richū assumed the throne, he sent his younger brother  to make arrangements for his marriage to consort . Prince Nakatsu instead passed himself off as his older brother Richū, and seduced Kuro-hime. He made a mistake however, by leaving his wrist-bells at Kuro-hime's house. Richū later discovered these during his first visit to her house, assumed what his brother had done, but decided to take no action against him. Nakatsu on the other hand was fearful of his actions and plotted to kill his brother that night. He secretly raised a small group of people who surrounded his brother's palace. Luckily for Richū, some of his loyal retainers intervened by rescuing the heir and carrying him off to safety to Isonokami Shrine in Yamoto. Nakatsu meanwhile set fire to the besieged palace not knowing of his brother's escape.

Learning of his escape, Richū's other younger brother  (later Emperor Hanzei) followed him to Yamoto. He was told though that unless he proved his loyality by killing Nakatsu he could not be trusted. Mizuhawake returned to Naniwa and bribed one of Nakatsu's retainers to kill him. At the time, Nakatsu had made no preparations as he thought was that his brother had fled and disappeared. Nakatsu was subsequently stabbed to death by his retainer, and Mizuhawake made his way back to Yamoto to report his death. Richū in turn gratefully granted his younger brother "Mura-ahase granaries.

Reign
Richū was crowned emperor after the rebellion had been put to rest in the following year (400 AD). During this time, those who were not executed for their participation in the rebellion were forced to undergo tattooing as a punishment. Kurohime was also officially appointed as a concubine later in that year. Although the two had two sons and a daughter, Richū appointed the title of "Crown Prince" to his brother Prince Mizuhawake (later Emperor Hanzei) in 401 AD. In the year 403 AD, "local recorders were appointed for the first time in various provinces, who noted down statements and communicated writings of the four quarters." Kurohime died sometime in the following year (404 AD) under unclear circumstances. Its said that the Emperor heard a voice in the wind utter mysterious words in the "great void" before a messenger announced of her death. Richū attributed the cause to an offended deity due to the misconduct of an official regarding a shrine. Princess Kusakanohatabino-hime was appointed empress in the following year (405 AD), and the two gave birth to a daughter (Princess Nakashi). A royal treasury was also established in that year which was managed by two appointed Koreans. Emperor Richū's brief reign ended during its sixth year, when he fell ill and succumbed to disease at the age of 64 or 70. The kiki states that Richū was buried in the misasagi on the "Plain of Mozo no Mimi". His brother Mizuhawake was enthroned as the next emperor in the following year (406 AD).

Known information

Richū is regarded by historians as a ruler during the early 5th century whose existence is generally accepted as fact. Orientalist scholar James Murdoch includes Emperor Richū in the "earliest non-legendary" sovereigns of Japan, while academic Richard Ponsonby-Fane stated that this "may be termed the semi-historical period". Scholar Francis Brinkley lists Emperor Richū under "Protohistoric sovereigns", and notes that rulers from this point forward no longer have reigns of "incredible length". Others such as author Joshua Frydman cite Emperor Richū's lifespan as being realistic in length. Richū has also been possibly identified with King San in the Book of Song by Confucian scholars  and Arai Hakuseki. According to Chinese records, King San sent messengers to the Liu Song dynasty at least twice in 421 and 425.

Scholars William George Aston and Brinkley disagree on the introduction of local recorders. Aston states that the arrival of the Korean scholar Wani did not take place until 405 AD, and "we have not yet got down to time of accurate chronologically". Brinkley counters this by saying that Wani's innovation was "not the art of writing, but, in all probability, a knowledge of the Chinese classics". Academic Delmer Brown wrote that during Richū's reign court waitresses (Uneme) appeared, and storehouses (Kura) were built in various provinces. There was also an "Administrator of State Affairs" from his reign on. In regards to Richū's death age, Aston also mentioned that various calculations such as 64, 77, 85, and 87 can't be relied on. Fane however, mentions that Richū died at the age of 67.

There is no evidence to suggest that the title tennō was used during the time to which Richū's reign has been assigned. It is certainly possible that he was a chieftain or local clan leader, and that the polity he ruled would have only encompassed a small portion of modern-day Japan. The name Richū-tennō was more than likely assigned to him posthumously by later generations. His name might have been regularized centuries after the lifetime ascribed to Richū, possibly during the time in which legends about the origins of the Yamato dynasty were compiled as the chronicles known today as the Kojiki.

While the actual site of Richū's grave is not known, this regent is traditionally venerated at a kofun-type Imperial tomb in Sakai, Osaka. The Imperial Household Agency designates this location as Richū's mausoleum, and is formally named . It is also identified as the  kofun. Outside of the Kiki, the reign of Emperor Kinmei ( – 571 AD) is the first for which contemporary historiography has been able to assign verifiable dates. The conventionally accepted names and dates of the early Emperors were not confirmed as "traditional" though, until the reign of Emperor Kanmu between 737 and 806 AD.

Consorts and children

Concubine/Spouse

Issue

Ancestry

See also
 Emperor of Japan
 List of Emperors of Japan
 Imperial cult

Notes

References

Further reading

 Aston, William George. (1896).  Nihongi: Chronicles of Japan from the Earliest Times to A.D. 697. London: Kegan Paul, Trench, Trubner.  
 Brown, Delmer M. and Ichirō Ishida, eds. (1979).  Gukanshō: The Future and the Past. Berkeley: University of California Press. ;  
 Ponsonby-Fane, Richard Arthur Brabazon. (1959).  The Imperial House of Japan. Kyoto: Ponsonby Memorial Society. 
 Titsingh, Isaac. (1834). Nihon Ōdai Ichiran; ou,  Annales des empereurs du Japon.  Paris: Royal Asiatic Society, Oriental Translation Fund of Great Britain and Ireland.  
 Varley, H. Paul. (1980).  Jinnō Shōtōki: A Chronicle of Gods and Sovereigns. New York: Columbia University Press. ;

External links
Imperial Household Agency webpage on mausoleum
Digital Burial Mound Encyclopedia entry

 
 

Japanese emperors
People of Kofun-period Japan
Failed assassination attempts in Japan
4th-century monarchs in Asia
5th-century monarchs in Asia
4th-century Japanese monarchs
5th-century Japanese monarchs
Year of birth unknown
405 deaths